Eodorcadion darigangense is a species of beetle in the family Cerambycidae. It was described by Heyrovský in 1967. It is known from Mongolia.

References

Dorcadiini
Beetles described in 1967